Zahid Malik (October 5, 1937 – September 1, 2016), was a Pakistani journalist and writer, who was the founder and editor-in-chief of Pakistan Observer.

He was also the founder-chairman of the think tank '101 Friends of China', a non-governmental organisation aimed towards improving Pak-China ties.

He also delivered over 100 lectures on various subjects to groups inside and outside Pakistan.  He received the Sitara-i-Imtiaz Award in 2011.  Pakistani EX-Prime Minister Nawaz Sharif expressed deep grief and sorrow over Mr Malik's demise and paid a rich tribute to him for his efforts towards press freedom.

Biography

Early life 
Born on October 5, 1937, in a small village of Sialkot District, Malik belonged to a well-educated family. After he completed his graduation from Jinnah Islamia College Sialkot, Malik started his career as a civil servant. After his retirement as a joint secretary in the Ministry of Information and Broadcasting, Malik launched a monthly Urdu news and views magazine Hurmat in 1980 and later started the English language daily Pakistan Observer. He was the Editor-in-Chief and publisher of the newspaper.

Religious views 
Malik was a devout Muslim; his daily routine started by offering fajr prayers in the morning and he recited the Quran several times a day.

Family 
Malik has four children; three sons and one daughter; they are all active in field of journalism.

Prisoner #2627 
When he was arrested on charges of official secret act, he was labelled as prisoner number 2627. He later used this as his pen name as used it to refer to himself in the books he wrote about Dr. A.Q. Khan.

Patriotism 
Malik considered himself a patriot, and only found himself at odds with his country on two occasions: once in 1971 when Bangladesh was separated from Pakistan, and again when he was arrested for writing the biography of Dr. A. Q. Khan, as he was wrongly being labelled as a traitor to the country (although he was officially pardoned by high court judge of that time).

Malik was patron-in-chief of the Nazaria-e-Pakistan Council, chairman of the International Seerat Centre and the Foundation for Coexistence of Civilizations. He was also the founder-chairman of the think tank '101 Friends of China', a non-governmental organisation aimed towards improving Pak-China ties.

A.Q. Khan 

Malik was a close friend and the only biographer of Dr. Abdul Qadeer Khan. He wrote several books about Khan, which include Dr A.Q. Khan and the Islamic Bomb (in English and Urdu) and Mohsin-e-Pakistan ki Debriefing.

When he completed writing the Khan's biography, he was arrested on 6 August 1989 on charges of violation of the Official Secrets Act. His arrest caused outrage in international media and among political leaders, so he was released on bail on 22 August.

He was put on trial for leaking government secrets in his book, but was found not guilty. Malik continued to support Khan as Khan was tried for selling nuclear secrets.

Kashmir cause 

Malik supported the cause of Kashmiri sovereignty, and published an editorial about the issue in his Pakistan Observer.  Every news regarding Kashmir is published there so that the world can see how hard the life of Kashmiri citizens have become.  He also hosted yearly conferences on February 5 (Kashmir Day) and August 14 (Pakistani Independence Day) to bring together political leaders to urge action on the matter.

Palestine cause 
Malik supported the Palestine cause, as he believed that Palestine deserves equal rights for settlement as Israel. He held a round table conference on July 19, 2014 in which he highlighted the violation of human rights by Israel and how Palestinians were suffering.  The ambassador of Palestine to Pakistan was also invited as chief guest. His actions in support of Palestine were discussed in the United Nations General Assembly.

Contribution to Muslim world 
Malik believed in Islamic ideology, and wrote several books on the topic, including Mazameen-e-Quran-e-hakeem and Mazameen-e-Ahadith. 

He also introduced the "Best Governed Muslim State" awards in order to boost the morale of the Muslim states that were performing good.

On his demise, the Saudi Ambassador to Pakistan (2016) came to his family for paying respects and said: "that it is not only the loss of your family, Zahid Malik's death is the loss of whole Muslim Ummah".

Mazameen-e-Quran-e-hakeem 
A book by Malik on the subject of the Quran. Malik wanted to contribute something to muslim world, he thought what would be better than if the last book of almighty Allah is indexed properly in terms of topics and all the verses can be found in one place regarding that topic, after years of hard work and dedication, Malik in 1980 finally completed and published this book.

The book was translated into different languages; Urdu, English, German, French, Hindi, etc. many versions have been published of this book some of which were not consulted about Zahid Malik. When asked that if he wanted to sue the publishers of these versions he simply replied "I wrote this book in order to help the Muslim, not for profit, hence I am not going to sue anyone."

The Best Governed Muslim state Awards 

In 2005 Pakistan Observer decided to start an initiative to award those Muslim states that have been a role model for others in terms of good governance.

So it was decided that a yearly award would be given out to the president of the state which fall in the category of best governed Muslim state. The editorial Board of Pakistan Observer, after going through a lengthy process of consultations and interaction with foreign policy experts, senior analysts, diplomats, researchers, economists and think-tanks decides the conferment of the award upon the deserving state and leader.

Pakistan Observer 
The Pakistan Observer was founded on 1 November 1988, as an English daily newspaper from Islamabad. It later became the only newspaper which was being published from six different stations, including Lahore and Karachi too.

Malik was the founder and the first Editor-in-Chief of the Pakistan Observer. Following his death, his eldest son, Faisal Zahid Malik, assumed the editorship.

Social diary Magazine 
A weekly magazine was also launched by the Pakistan Observer to cover the latest fashion and trends news from around the world. The magazine's editor is Sadia Zahid Malik, the only daughter of Zahid Malik.

Sitara-i-Imtiaz 
Zahid Malik received a Sitara-i-Imtiaz on August 14, 2011 for his contributions towards journalism, the promotion of the ideology of Pakistan and writings about religion.

References

1937 births
2016 deaths
Pakistani male journalists
Pakistani newspaper founders
Pakistani newspaper editors
Recipients of Sitara-i-Imtiaz